2nd Itkulovo (Russian: 2-е Иткулово; , 2-se Etqol) is a rural locality (a selo) in Nigamatovsky Selsoviet, Baymaksky District, Russia. The population was 853 as of 2010.

Geography 
2nd Itkulovo is located 37 km northwest of Baymak (the district's administrative centre) by road. Nigamatovo is the nearest rural locality.

Ethnicity 
The village is inhabited by mostly Bashkirs.

Streets 
 Lenina
 Lesnaya
 Mira
 Revolutsionnaya
 S. Yulaeva

References

External links 
 2nd Itkulovo on travellers.ru

Rural localities in Baymaksky District